This is an inclusive list of science fiction television programs whose names begin with the letter F.

F
Live-action
A Fairly Odd Movie: Grow Up, Timmy Turner! (2011, film)
Falling Skies (2011–2015)
Fantastic Journey, The (1977)
Fantasy Island (1977)
Fantasy Island (1998)
Far Out Space Nuts (1975–1976)
Farscape (franchise):
Farscape (1999–2003, Australia/US)
Farscape: The Peacekeeper Wars (2004, miniseries)
Final Fantasy (franchise):
Fireball XL5 (1962–1963, puppetry)
Firefly (2002–2003)
Firestarter: Rekindled (2002, miniseries)
First, The (2018)
First Wave (1998–2001, Canada/US)
Flash, The (franchise):
Flash, The (1990–1991)
Flash, The (2014–present)
Flash Gordon (franchise):
Flash Gordon (1954–1955)
Flash Gordon (2007–2008, US/Canada)
FlashForward (2009–2010)
For All Mankind (2019–present)
Foundation (2021–present)
Frank Herbert's Dune (franchise):
Frank Herbert's Dune (2000, miniseries)
Frank Herbert's Children of Dune (2003, miniseries)
Frankenstein (franchise) (elements of science fiction):
Frankenstein: The True Story (1973, UK, film)
Struck by Lightning (1979)
Frankenstein (1993, US, film) IMDb
House of Frankenstein (1997, NBC, miniseries)
Frankenstein (2004, USA Network, film)
Frankenstein (2004, Hallmark Channel, miniseries)
Frankenstein (2007, ITV, film)
Mary Shelley's Frankenhole (2010–12)
Freaky (2003, New Zealand)
FreakyLinks (2000–2001) (elements of science fiction in some episodes)
Freddy's Nightmares (1988–1990)
Freedom (2000)
Frequency (2016–2017)
Friday the 13th: The Series (1987–1990, Canada)
Fringe (2008–2013)
FTL Newsfeed (1992–1996, clip)
Future Cop (1976–1978)
Future Man (2017–2020)

Animated
Fairly OddParents, The (franchise) (elements of science fiction):
Jimmy Timmy Power Hour, The (2004, film, animated)
Jimmy Timmy Power Hour 2: When Nerds Collide, The (2006, film, animated)
Jimmy Timmy Power Hour 3: The Jerkinators, The (2007, film, animated)
Fairly OddParents, The (2001–2017, animated)
Fairly OddParents: Abra-Catastrophe!, The (2003, film, animated)
Channel Chasers (2004, film, animated)
School's Out! The Musical (2005, film, animated)
Fairy Idol (2006, film, animated)
Fairly OddBaby (2008, film, animated)
Fairly OddParents: Wishology, The (2009, film, animated)
Family Guy (1999–present, animated) (franchise) (elements of science fiction in some episodes):
Blue Harvest (2007, episode, animated)
Something, Something, Something, Dark Side (2010, episode, animated)
It's a Trap! (2011, episode, animated)
Family's Defensive Alliance, The (2001, Japan, animated)
Fang of the Sun Dougram (1981–1983, Japan, animated)
Fantastic Four (franchise):
Fantastic Four (1967–1970, animated)
Fantastic Four (1978, animated)
Fantastic Four (1994–1996, animated)
Fantastic Four: World's Greatest Heroes (2006–2007, animated)
Fantastic Max (1988–1990, animated)
Fantastic Voyage (1968–1969, animated)
Final Fantasy: Unlimited (2001–2002, Japan, animated) (elements of science fiction in some episodes)
Final Space (2018–2021, animated)
Fireball (franchise):
Fireball (2009, Japan/US, animated)
Fireball Charming (2011, Japan/US, animated)
Firebreather (2010, film, animated)
Firestorm (2002–2003, Japan/UK, animated)
Fist of the North Star (franchise):
Fist of the North Star (1984–1987, Japan, animated)
Fist of the North Star 2 (1987–1988, Japan, animated)
Legends of the Dark King: A Fist of the North Star Story (2008, Japan, animated)
Flash Gordon (franchise):
New Adventures of Flash Gordon, The a.k.a. Adventures of Flash Gordon, The a.k.a. Flash Gordon (1979–1980, animated)
Flash Gordon: The Greatest Adventure of All (1982, animated)
Flash Gordon a.k.a. The Adventures of Flash Gordon, The (1996–1997, US/France/Canada, animated)
Freedom Force, The (1978, animated, Tarzan and the Super 7 segment)
Freedom Project (2006–2008, Japan, animated)
Freezing (2011–2013, Japan, animated)
Frisky Dingo (franchise):
Frisky Dingo (2006–2008, animated)
Xtacles, The (2008, spin-off, animated)
Full Metal Panic! a.k.a. FMP! (franchise):
Full Metal Panic? Fumoffu (2003, Japan, animated)
Full Metal Panic!: The Second Raid (2006, Japan, animated)
Fullmetal Alchemist (franchise):
Fullmetal Alchemist a.k.a. Hagane no Renkinjutsushi (2003–2004, Japan, animated)
Fullmetal Alchemist: Brotherhood a.k.a. Hagane no Renkinjutsushi: Furumetaru Arukemisuto (2009–2010, Japan, animated)
Futurama (1999–2003, 2008–2013, animated)
Future Boy Conan (1978, Japan, animated)
Future is Wild, The (franchise):
Future is Wild, The (2003–2004, UK/Austria/Germany, docufiction, animated)
Future is Wild, The (2007–2008, US, docufiction, animated)

References

Television programs, F